FTR was a British rapid-transit bus system formerly operated in Leeds, Luton, Swansea and York. FirstGroup introduced the system, using 39 Wright StreetCar articulated buses in conjunction with infrastructure upgrades by local authorities. The vehicles were branded as "the future of travel", the operators claiming that ftr is Abjadic textspeak for the word future.

Elements
The FTR concept was made up of a bundle of simultaneously introduced innovations relating to the vehicle type, its configuration, the fare collection arrangements, consequent changes to infrastructure, and an integrated data-handling system for voice radio, vehicle location, real-time passenger information, on-board displays, vehicle diagnostics, and ticket machine data.

Vehicles
Each 'StreetCar' vehicle had a separate driver (or "pilot") compartment, resembling to some extent similar designs in continental Europe. Otherwise the vehicle itself was a modified conventional bus, with styling similar to contemporary trams and trolleybuses and a greater distance between axles to maximise the low-floor area for easily accessible seating. The vehicles were air-conditioned and had tinted windows to enhance the on-board ambience along with ergonomic seating. On-board information was provided using an "infotainment" screen which displayed the next FTR stop (in a similar fashion to Transport for London's i-Bus system) and information related to that stop including local attractions/facilities and connecting bus/train routes. The screen also displayed advertisements for local businesses.

Ticketing system
A major difference between FTR and conventional bus services was the method of fare collection. In York, this initially involved purchase of cash fares from a self-service ticket machine or from a conductor, because the design of FTR allowed no contact between driver and passengers. This was intended to reduce journey times but problems with ticketing machines resulted in their withdrawal. On the FTR route 4 in Leeds, all passengers bought tickets from, or showed bus passes and permits to, the conductor.

Operations

Bradford & Leeds (Hyperlink)

Following the cancellation of the Leeds Supertram project, the local passenger transport executive Metro suggested various bus rapid transit options as a replacement, one of which was an FTR service. The FTR system was chosen, and the service ran from early 2007 until autumn 2012, on Route 4 'Olive Line' (part of the Leeds Overground colour-coded network of high frequency First Bus Routes) between Pudsey and Seacroft via City Square. The FTR buses were then refurbished, Wi-Fi installed, and given a new livery branded Hyperlink, ready for a new high-frequency service on route 72 connecting Leeds to Bradford.

In July 2016, the FTR articulated buses were replaced by brand new Wright StreetDeck buses, with the Hyperlink brand withdrawn.

York

FTR first operated in York with the conversion of First York's route 4 between Acomb and the University of York. The service began on 8 May 2006, after the city council had made significant and expensive alterations to the road layout to accommodate the new vehicles.
The York FTR service was withdrawn in March 2012.

Luton Airport
Four FTR buses were operated for First Capital Connect by First Northampton, providing a frequent link between the airport and Luton Airport Parkway railway station. These were replaced by Mercedes-Benz Citaro O530Gs, releasing the FTRs for use in Swansea. The use of bigger buses reflects growth in the number of people using the airport rail link, which has more than doubled since the Parkway station opened in 1999. It carried almost 10 million people a year. The FTR were branded as train2plane and ran every 10 minutes, 19 hours a day (05:00 – 00:00), and connected with all trains from London during the night. In March 2023, an automated people mover came into service, Luton DART, replacing the Luton Airport bus link.

Swansea

Swansea gained a similar operation from 1 June 2009 with FTRs running on route 4 in a phased introduction over several months. The service, publicised as ftrmetro, links Morriston Hospital, Morriston, the City Centre and the University/Singleton Hospital, with five services per hour through the daytime. Extensive streetworks were carried out along the route, including segregated running through the city centre and an "express route" by-passing the busy residential streets of Hafod. The fleet of Wright StreetCar articulated vehicles were removed from Swansea on 28 August 2015; First Cymru cited refurbishment costs as a key factor. Although the articulated vehicles were removed from service, the same route is now served by standard single-deck Wright StreetLite buses and other similar vehicles.

Developments
The launch of the FTR in York generated almost saturation coverage in the local media. On 10 May 2006 The Press devoted four full pages to it, including its front page and a double-page spread of 12 readers' letters, almost all of them hostile. The next day the paper published a defence of the vehicles' teething problems by First York's commercial director, accompanied by another five hostile letters. Another full-page article appeared two days later, and this was followed by national press coverage. On 17 May 2006, councillor Ann Reid was quoted as saying "The majority [of complaints] seem to have come from those who don't live on the route or certainly don't even catch the bus". The student press criticised the FTRs. Student anger was particularly directed at the price of tickets on the FTR, which increased by 20% in 2008 for a single ticket from campus into town. The price problem was resolved when the students' union negotiated a £2 student price for a return ticket from the campus to town.

References

External links

Bus transport in England
Guided busways and BRT systems in the United Kingdom
Transport in Luton/Dunstable Urban Area
Transport in Swansea
Transport in West Yorkshire
Transport in York